Ehteshamul Haq Nasim Biswas was a Bangladesh Nationalist Party politician and the former Member of Parliament from Barisal-5.

Biography
Biswas was the fourth son of Abdur Rahman Biswas, former President of Bangladesh, and Hosne Ara Rahman. He studied medicine at Sher e Bangla Medical College and graduated in 1984. He was a doctor and professor before being elected to parliament in 1996 from Barisal-5 as a candidate of Bangladesh Nationalist Party. One of his campaign pledges was the construction of Taltali Bridge, construction of which started in 1996 undertaken by Moitry International. Biswas died in 1998, and his successors did not see to the continuation of the project. As of 2008, the project remains incomplete.

Death
Biswas died on 12 March 1998 after suffering health complications from food poisoning. He is succeeded by his wife and daughter.

References

Bangladesh Nationalist Party politicians
1998 deaths
7th Jatiya Sangsad members
1960 births